Tony Stone may refer to one of the following people:

Tony Stone (filmmaker), American independent filmmaker
Tony Stone (music producer) (born 1982), American music producer and project developer for Christian hip hop artists
Tony Stone (Edinburgh), Scottish entrepreneur and founder of porridge maker Stoats Porridge Bars  
 Anthony Stone, Emeritus professor of Chemistry at the University of Cambridge

See also
Toni Stone (1921-1996), born Marcenia Lyle Stone, American professional baseball player